Chiasmia subvaria is a moth of the family Geometridae first described by Max Bastelberger in 1907. It is found in subtropical Africa and is known from Angola, Cameroon, Ivory Coast, Kenya, Rwanda, Tanzania, Uganda and Zimbabwe.

The basic colour of its wings is yellow brown, crossed by three black-brown transversal lines. The wingspan is 33 mm.

References

Macariini
Moths described in 1907